Tróndur Jensen (born 6 February 1993) is a Faroese footballer who plays for NSÍ as a midfielder.

On 8 July 2014, he scored in a 5–2 home win over Gibraltar's Lincoln Red Imps in the UEFA Champions League first qualifying round second leg (6–3 aggregate).

He made his debut for the Faroe Islands national football team on 28 March 2016, playing the entirety of a 3–2 win over Liechtenstein at the Estadio Municipal de Marbella in Spain.

Honours
Faroe Islands Premier League: 2013

References

External links
 
 

1993 births
Living people
Faroese footballers
Association football midfielders
Havnar Bóltfelag players
Faroe Islands international footballers